Chromosome 1 open reading frame 185, also known as C1orf185, is a protein that in humans is encoded by the C1orf185 gene. In humans, C1orf185 is a lowly expressed protein that has been found to be occasionally expressed in the circulatory system.

Gene 
C1orf185 is located on chromosome 1 in humans on the positive strand between bases 51,102,221 and 51,148,086. There are 5 exons in the main splice isoform, however the number and selection of exons varies based on the isoform

mRNA and Protein Isoforms 
C1orf185 has 5 different splice isoforms in humans.

Protein 
C1orf185 is a member of the pfam15842 protein family, containing a domain of unknown function, DUF4718. This family of proteins is between 130 and 224 amino acids long, and is found only in eukaryotes..

The main splice isoform of C1orf185 has a molecular weight of 22.4 kDa and an isoelectric point of 7.67. It contains a transmembrane domain spanning from positions 15 to 37. There is also a conserved serine-rich region  from S123 to S142, which could possibly indicate function as a "splicing activator".

C1orf185 contains 3 primary subcellular domains: an extracellular domain which spans the amino acids from positions 1 to 14, a transmembrane domain from positions 15–37, and a large intracellular domain from positions 38–199.

Below are predicted secondary and tertiary structures of C1orf185, modeled using the Chou-Fasman secondary structure prediction tool and the I-TASSER protein structure and function prediction tool. Chou-Fasman predicts a mixture of α-helices, β-sheets, and other structural turns and coils, which can be seen modeled on the I-TASSER prediction.

Regulation of Expression

Gene Level Regulation 
Below is a diagram showing the locations of predicted transcription factor binding sites in the C1orf185 promoter, along with a table describing the attributes of each individual binding site. The transcription factors were found and analyzed using the ElDorado tool from Genomatix.

Matrix similarity correlates to the confidence in the prediction for each individual binding sites. +/- correlates to presence on either the positive or negative strand. The transcription factors are listed in order of appearance from beginning to end of the promoter.

C1orf185 has a very low expression pattern, with the only site in the body showing any signs of expression being the circulatory system. Two NCBI GEO profiles have shown that C1orf185 was consistently overexpressed in whole blood samples within a group of postmenopausal women, as well as being somewhat overexpressed in the peripheral blood of Parkinson's patients compared to controls.

Transcript Level Regulation 
Below is a figure produced by mfold showing predicted mRNA structure of the 3' UTR of C1orf185.

C1orf185 has one conserved miRNA binding site of type 7mer-A1 among several orthologs. The presence of a 7mer-A1 binding site indicates that C1orf185 is likely to be post-transcriptionally repressed.

Protein Level Regulation 
Below is a figure and table showing predicted post-translational modification sites for C1orf185.

The presence of multiple leusine glycation sites indicate that there may be ways to deter the function of the protein, as glycation has been associated with the loss of protein function in blood vessels

Clinical Significance 
C1orf185 has been shown to play a role in the circulatory system, likely in a more reactive role, as it is lowly expressed across many species. It appears in studies surrounding atrial fibrillation and abnormal QRS duration, which implies it may play a role in those circulatory diseases.

Homology 
Below is a table showing C1orf185 orthologs across a variety of conserved species. Orthologs were found using NCBI BLAST, the dates of divergence were found using TimeTree, and the global sequence identities and similarities were found using the Clustal Omega multiple sequence alignment tool.

Compared to other genes, C1orf185 appears to be evolving and changing relatively quickly, as it is only conserved in mammals and a few turtles, and more distant mammals have quite distant similarities. Primates are the only taxonomic group that heavily conserves this gene with regards to the human sequence, while other mammals and turtles only heavily conserve the transmembrane domain (positions 15–37). As primates and mammals are warm-blooded, this may further support the evidence showing a possible role in the circulatory system.

References 

Human proteins